The Basque Nationalist Party–Basque Solidarity alliance (English for Partido Nacionalista Vasco–Eusko Alkartasuna) was the electoral coalition formed by the Basque Nationalist Party (PNV) and Eusko Alkartasuna (EA) to contest local and regional elections in the Basque Country (as PNV–EA) and Navarre (as EA–PNV) between 1999 and 2006. It also contested the 1999 European Parliament election.

PNV and EA, the later of which had split from the former in 1986, reached an electoral coalition agreement on 13 March 1999, in order to counter the electoral ascendance of both the People's Party of the Basque Country and Euskal Herritarrok. The alliance was disbanded after EA's leadership voted on 31 August 2006 not to preserve the coalition ahead of the 2007 local elections.

Composition

Electoral performance

Regional parliaments

Basque Parliament

Parliament of Navarre

European Parliament

References

Political parties established in 1999
Political parties disestablished in 2006
Political parties in the Basque Country (autonomous community)
Defunct political party alliances in Spain
1999 establishments in Spain
2006 disestablishments in Spain
Basque nationalism
Nationalist parties in Spain